Craterocapsa is a genus of plants in the family Campanulaceae. It contains 5 known species, all native to southern Africa.

 Craterocapsa alfredica D.Y.Hong - KwaZulu-Natal
 Craterocapsa congesta Hilliard & B.L.Burtt - Lesotho, South Africa
 Craterocapsa insizwae (Zahlbr.) Hilliard & B.L.Burtt - South Africa
 Craterocapsa montana (A.DC.) Hilliard & B.L.Burtt - Lesotho, South Africa
 Craterocapsa tarsodes Hilliard & B.L.Burtt - Eswatini, Zimbabwe, Lesotho, South Africa

References

Campanuloideae
Campanulaceae genera
Flora of Africa